Camille Le Joly (born 1 March 1992 at Angers) is a    French athlete who specializes in the combined events.

Biography  
She began athletics in 2004 in the SCJB club of Angers.  In 2010, she placed 14th in the World Junior Championships, at Moncton, in Canada. A Junior Champion of France in the heptathlon in 2011, she finished 13th at the European Junior Championships in Tallinn.

In early 2013 season, she won the National French Indoor title for the  pentathlon at the French Indoors championships, at Aubière, with a  personal best of 3,995 pts.  In July 2013, she won the national title in the heptathlon at the French championships at Charléty Stadium in Paris, finishing second in the actual competition behind the British Grace Clements.

Prize list  
 French Championships in Athletics   :
 winner of the heptathlon 2013
 French Athletics Indoors Championships:
 winner of the pentathlon 2013

Records

Notes and references

External links  
 

1992 births
Living people
French female athletes
French heptathletes
French pentathletes